The 1929–30 Montreal Maroons season was the 6th season for the National Hockey League franchise.

Offseason

Regular season

Final standings

Record vs. opponents

Game log

Playoffs
They made it into the playoffs and went against Boston in a best of five series and lost in 4 games, or 1–3.

Player stats

Regular season
Scoring

Goaltending

Playoffs
Scoring

Goaltending

Note: GP = Games played; G = Goals; A = Assists; Pts = Points; +/- = Plus/minus; PIM = Penalty minutes; PPG = Power-play goals; SHG = Short-handed goals; GWG = Game-winning goals
      MIN = Minutes played; W = Wins; L = Losses; T = Ties; GA = Goals against; GAA = Goals against average; SO = Shutouts;

Awards and records

Transactions

See also
1929–30 NHL season

References

External links

Montreal
Montreal
Montreal Maroons seasons